The Revmaster 2100D is a Volkswagen air-cooled engine modified for homebuilt aircraft with dual magneto ignition.

Specifications (variant)

References

1960s aircraft piston engines